Kingdom Come is a novel by Melvyn Bragg, first published in 1980. It is the third part of Bragg's Cumbrian Trilogy.

The story moves from Thurston (Bragg's name for Wigton), to London and New York, some time in the 1970s, and follows a series of major disruptions in the life of Douglas Tallentire, a writer and TV producer. Douglas is the son of Joseph Tallentire, the central character of Bragg's A Place in England, and grandson of John Tallentire, central character of The Hired Man.

1980 British novels
Novels by Melvyn Bragg
Novels set in Cumbria
Novels set in London
Novels set in New York (state)
Secker & Warburg books
Novels set in the 1970s